The Battle of Pandarane was a naval engagement between the Portuguese forces commanded by Lopo Soares de Albergaria, a famous Portuguese commander, and a large fleet of then Mamluk Sultan. The Portuguese were victorious.

References

Pandarane
Pandarane
1504 in India